Marija Papudjieva (born 26 June 1977) is a Macedonian handball player for Bodrum Kalikarnas and the Macedonian national team.

References

1977 births
Living people
Macedonian female handball players